Arthur Phillip High School (abbreviated as APHS) is a coeducational public high school, located in Parramatta, New South Wales, Australia. The school was established in 1960 in its own right, in buildings which had been used continuously as a school since 1875, and is named for Arthur Phillip, the first governor of the state of New South Wales and the founder of the city of Sydney.

History 
Parramatta South Public School opened in 1873, and in 1875 moved to Smith Street. In 1887 it became a "Superior Public School" offering both primary and post-primary courses. In 1907 it was renamed Parramatta. For many years, boys' and girls' post-primary classes were taught separately in the adjacent buildings. In 1944, they were combined into a Central School. At the start of 1958, the primary school moved to Macquarie Street, where it remains today. In 1960, the secondary classes were separately established as Arthur Phillip High School.
At the front of the main side of its two-part campus the Old School House building, now a museum, is situated and contains photos and items pertaining to education in Australia's early colonial era and beyond. The Old School House is the oldest continuously used educational building in Sydney.

Campus 
The campus is located at the corner of Smith Street and Macquarie Street in Parramatta's central business district, on both sides of Macquarie Street. The architectural front and main entrance of the school faces Smith Street, however it is rarely used and is an artefact of a different structure which has now changed due to the building's numerous appendages. The school has a central courtyard around which the main classroom buildings are arranged, and additional sports grounds which have gradually decreased in size due to an increase in demountable classrooms.

Social initiatives 

Arthur Phillip High School has a Refugee Transition Program which engages with the wider migrant and refugee community in Western Sydney.

Incidents and accidents

Terrorist student

In 2015, a high school student was arrested after he encouraged terrorism. The arrest happened after the 2015 Parramatta shooting, in which a police accountant was killed.

Student stabbing attack

On 23 November 2020, the school went to lockdown after a stabbing attack on a 14 year old male student, NSW Police was alerted at 8:30 am (AEDT) in the morning and searched around the area. However, no arrests were made after the investigation. Officers from Parramatta Police Area Command have established a crime scene are investigating how the boy was stabbed, the boy got serious injuries after multiple stab wounds on his body and was taken to hospital soon after, however, classes were resumed after the incident unfolded.

See also 

 List of government schools in New South Wales
 Education in Australia

References

External links 
 

Educational institutions established in 1875
1875 establishments in Australia
Public high schools in Sydney
Schools in Parramatta